Hidding is a surname. Notable people with the surname include:

Friedrich Hidding (1926–2011), German field hockey player
Rene Hidding (born 1953), Australian politician
Tineke Hidding (born 1959), Dutch heptathlete

See also
Hiding (disambiguation)